The Women's War, or Aba Women's Protest (Igbo: Ogu Umunwanyi; Ibibio: Ekong Iban), was a period of unrest in colonial Nigeria over November 1929. The protests broke out when thousands of Igbo women from the Bende District, Umuahia and other places in southeastern Nigeria traveled to the town of Oloko to protest against the Warrant Chiefs, whom they accused of restricting the role of women in the government. The protest encompassed women from six ethnic groups (Igbo, Ibibio, Andoni, Ogoni, Efik, and Ijaw).

It was organised and led by the rural women of Owerri and Calabar provinces. The modus operandi of the protests involved 'sit-in' by the women. During the events, many Warrant Chiefs were forced to resign and 16 Native Courts were attacked, most of which were destroyed. It was the first major revolt by women in West Africa. In 1930 the colonial government abolished the system of warrant chieftains, and appointed women to the Native Court system. These reforms were built upon by the African women and have been seen as a prelude to the emergence of mass African nationalism.

History of women organizing in Nigeria 

There was a long history of collective action by women in Nigeria prior to the revolt. In the 1910s, women in Agbaja stayed away from their homes for a month in protest due to  suspicions among them that some men had been secretly killing pregnant women. Their collective absence pushed village elders to take action to address their concerns. In 1924, 3000 women in Calabar protested a market toll that was imposed by the colonial authorities. In Southwestern Nigeria, there were other female organizations such as the Lagos Market Women's Association, Nigerian Women's Party, and Abeokuta Women's Union. There was also an "elaborate system of women's market networks" which the Igbo and Ibibio women used to communicate information to organize and coordinate during the revolt.

Events and causes 

In actuality, the emergence of the Aba Women's War was long in the making. Colonial rule in Nigeria altered the position of various Nigerian women in their societies. Women had been traditionally allowed to participate in the governance of the local region and held a major role in the marketplace as well. Men and women also worked collaboratively in the domestic sphere, and were recognized  both to have important individual roles. Women also had the privilege of participating in political movements due to the fact that they were married to elites. The colonial authorities saw these practices as "a manifestation of chaos and disorder", and they attempted to create political institutions which commanded authority and monopolized force. While they considered the political institutions headed by Igbo men, they ignored those of the women, effectively shutting them out from political power. The colonial authorities believed that this patriarchal and masculine order would establish a moral order throughout the colony. The women became increasingly dissatisfied with colonial rule because of increased school fees, corruption by native officers, and forced labor.

The event that ultimately led to the war was the introduction of direct taxation. In April 1927, the colonial government in Nigeria took measures to enforce the Native Revenue (Amendment) Ordinance. A colonial resident, W. E. Hunt, was commissioned by the lieutenant governor of Nigeria to explain the provisions and objects of the new ordinance to the people throughout the five provinces in the Eastern Region. This was to prepare the ground for the introduction of direct taxation due to take effect in April 1928. Direct taxation on men was introduced in 1928 without major incidents, thanks to the carefully planned actions during the preceding twelve months. In September 1929, Captain J. Cook, an assistant District Officer, was sent to take over the Bende division temporarily from the serving district officer, a Mr. Weir, until the return of Captain Hill from leave in November. Upon taking over, Cook found the original nominal rolls for taxation purposes inadequate because they did not include details of the number of wives, children, and livestock in each household. He set about revising the nominal roll. This exercise brought the colonial authorities into direct conflict with women in Eastern Nigeria and was the catalyst for fundamental change in the local administration.

The announcement of Cook's intention to revise the nominal roll was made to a few chiefs in Oloko Native Court and the counting began about October 14, 1929. The women of Oloko suspected that the enumeration exercise was a prelude to the extension of direct taxation, which had been imposed on the men the previous year. Women were already burdened with supporting their families and helping men pay their taxes. Because the women did not have political power within the patriarchal system under colonial rule, they utilized collective action to communicate their dissatisfaction. On December 2, 1929, more than ten thousand women demonstrated at Oloko, Bende, against the enumeration of men, women, and livestock by the acting district officer. This event at Oloko was to spread to most parts of the Eastern Region within the next four weeks in the Ogu Umunwanyi or Women's War of 1929.

From November to December, women from Owerri to Calabar looted factories and destroyed Native Court buildings and properties along with the property of members of the Native Court.

Oloko 
The Aba Women's War was sparked by a dispute between a woman named Nwanyeruwa and a man, Mark Emereuwa, who was helping to make a census of the people living in the town controlled by the Warrant, Okugo. Nwanyeruwa was of Ngwa ancestry, and had been married in the town of Oloko. In Oloko, the census was related to taxation, and women in the area were worried about who would tax them, especially during the period of hyperinflation in the late 1920s. The financial crash of 1929 impeded women's ability to trade and produce so they sought assurance from the colonial government that they would not to be required to pay taxes. Faced with a halt in their political demands, the women settled that they would not pay taxes nor have their property appraised.

On the morning of November 18, Emereuwa arrived at Nwanyereuwa's house and approached her, since her husband Ojim had already died. He told the widow to "count her goats, sheep and people." Since Nwanyereuwa understood this to mean, "How many of these things do you have so we can tax you based on them", she was angry. She replied by saying "Was your widowed mother counted?," meaning "that women don't pay tax in traditional Igbo society." The two exchanged angry words, and Emeruwa grabbed Nwanyeruwa by the throat. Nwanyeruwa went to the town square to discuss the incident with other women who happened to be holding a meeting to discuss the issue of taxing women. Believing they would be taxed, based on Nwanyeruwa's account, the Oloko women invited other women (by sending leaves of palm-oil trees) from other areas in the Bende District, as well as from Umuahia and Ngwa. They gathered nearly 10,000 women who protested at the office of Warrant Chief Okugo, demanding his resignation and calling for a trial.

The Oloko Trio 
The leaders of the protest in Oloko are known as the Oloko Trio: Ikonnia, Nwannedia and Nwugo.  The three were known for their persuasion, intelligence and passion. When protests became tense, it was often these three who were able to deescalate the situation, preventing violence. However, after two women were killed while blocking roads as a form of protest, the trio was not able to calm the situation there, the police and army were sent to the town.

The legacy of Nwanyeruwa
Due to her contribution to the Women's War, Madame Nwanyeruwa is and still remains the name that comes up when bringing up the history of militancy of women in Nigeria, and has been said to be linked to the history of the emergence of African nationalism. Nwanyereuwa played a major role in keeping the protests non-violent. She was advanced in age compared to many who led the protests. Under her advice, the women protested in song and dance, "sitting" on the Warrant Chiefs until they surrendered their insignia of office and resigned. As the revolt spread, other groups followed this pattern, making the women's protest a peaceful one. Other groups came to Nwanyeruwa to get in writing the inspirational results of the protests, which, as Nwanyeruwa saw them, were that, "women will not pay tax till the world ends [and] Chiefs were not to exist any more." Women of Oloko and elsewhere brought money contributions to Madam Nwanyeruwa for helping them avoid paying taxes. Unfortunately, many women rioted and attacked Chiefs, destroying their homes and causing the revolt to be seen as violent.

Madam Mary Okezie 
Madam Mary Okezie (1906–1999) was the first woman from her Igbo clan to gain a Western education, and was teaching at the Anglican Mission School in Umuocham Aba in 1929 when the women's revolt broke out. Although she did not participate in the revolt, she was very sympathetic to the women's cause. She was the only woman who submitted a memo of grievance to the Aba Commission of Inquiry (sent in 1930). Today, the major primary source for studying the revolt is the Report of the Aba Commission of Inquiry. After the revolt, Madam Okezie emerged as founder and leader of the Ngwa Women's Association and working for the rest of her life to support women's rights in Nigeria.

Other major figures 
Mary of Ogu Ndem (Mary of the Women's War)
Ihejilemebi Ibe of Umuokirika Village

Means of protest/protest strategies 

A major tactic in the protests was what is known as "sitting". Scholars like Glover have noted that men who did not value women, risked the possibility of being shunned and sat on by those who felt normalcy had to be restored within their society. "Sitting on a man" or "making war on a man" was a long held tradition used as the women's main weapon when faced with injustices in their society. Scholars like Green (1964), Judith Van Allen (1976), and Monday Effiong Noah (1985) have noted that some methods used by Aba women were :surrounding the home of the man in question, insulting his manhood, and destroying anything that he would characterize as a prized possession. Women would gather at the compound of the man in question, and sing and dance while detailing the women's grievances against him. The women would often bang on his hut, demolish it, or plaster it with mud. Actions like mistreating his wife or violating women's market rules were punishable by being "sit on." If necessary, these practices were continued until he repented and changed his ways. During the March of Grand-Bassam the method of sitting on a man was also used when a man got his girlfriend arrested after she put his RDA card into her underwear. Women then invaded the courts and when threatened by police began to dance and take their clothes off: a method used as a powerful form of resistance. The nakedness of women in many African and Sahelian communities was considered a taboo that indicated the force of power women had to stop the malfeasance. When it came to the Warrant Chiefs, along with singing and dancing around the houses and offices, the women would follow their every move, invading their space and forcing the men to pay attention. The wives of the Warrant Chiefs were often disturbed and they too put pressure on the Warrants to listen to the demands of the women. This tactic of "sitting on the Warrants," i.e. following them everywhere and anywhere, was very popular with the women in Nigeria, and used to great effect. Through the choice of clothing, the use of body language and choice of song, drew attention to the role and status of women in Nigeria, particularly in protection the good of the land. Other men in the village rarely came to their rescue and would say that they brought the wrath of women onto themselves.

Aba commission of enquiry

The first commission of enquiry occurred in early January 1930, but was met with little success. The second inquiry, called the Aba commission, met in March 1930. The commission held public sittings for thirty-eight days at various locations in the Owerri and Calabar Provinces and interviewed 485 witnesses. Of this total number of witnesses, only about 103 were women. The rest consisted of local men and British administrative officials who were either called to explain their role in the revolt or why they could not stop the women.

Results 
The women were able to transform "traditional methods for networking and expressing disapproval" into powerful mechanisms that successfully challenged and disrupted the local colonial administration. The women's protests were carried out on a scale that the colonial authorities had never witnessed in any part of Africa. The rebellion extended over six thousand square miles containing all of Owerri and Calabar Provinces, home to roughly two million people. Until the end of December 1929, when colonial troops restored order, ten native courts were destroyed, a number of others were damaged, houses of native court personnel were attacked, and European factories at Imo River, Aba, Mbawsi, and Amata were looted. Women attacked prisons and released prisoners. But the response of the colonial authority was also decisive. By the time order was restored, about fifty-five women were killed by the colonial troops. The last soldiers left Owerri on the 27 December 1929, and the last patrol in Abak Division withdrew on 9 January 1930. By 10 January 1930, the revolt was regarded as successfully suppressed. Throughout late December 1929 and early January 1930, more than thirty collective punishment inquiries were carried out. It is generally believed, according to Nina Mba, that this event marked the end of the women's activities because the new administration under Governor Donald Cameron took into account some of the women's recommendations in revising the structure of the Native Administration. Thus, the Women's War is seen as the historical dividing point in British colonial administration in Nigeria with far reaching implications. The Women's War was also instrumental in marking the rise of gender ideology, offering women who were not married to the elites the opportunity to engage in social actions.

As a result of the protests, the position of women in society was greatly improved. In some areas, women were able to replace the Warrant Chiefs. Women were also appointed to serve on the Native Courts. After the Women's war, women's movements were very strong in Ngwaland, many events in the 1930s, 40s and 50s were inspired by the Women's War, including the Tax Protests of 1938, the Oil Mill Protests of the 1940s in Owerri and Calabar Provinces and the Tax Revolt in Aba and Onitsha in 1956 . On two occasions district officers were called and local military and paramilitary forces ordered to break up the protests. During these occasions, at least 50 women were shot dead and 50 more wounded. The women themselves never seriously injured anybody against whom they were protesting, nor any of the forces who broke up those protests.

Name discrepancy 
The event goes by many different names, including (but not limited to) Aba Women's Riots of 1929, Aba Women's War, and The Women's Market Rebellion of 1929. It is usually referred to as the "Aba Women's Riots of 1929" because that was how it was named in British records. The women utilized protest techniques that were traditional and specific to their communities, such as sitting on a man and wearing traditional ritual wear. While the men in the community understood what those techniques and tactics meant, the British did not because they were outsiders. As such, the event appeared to be "crazy acts by hysterical women," thus calling the events riots. Scholars have argued that calling the event "Aba Riots" de-politicizes the "feminist impetus" as well as frame the events through a colonial lens. Since the event was called "Ogu Umunwanyi" in Igbo and "Ekong Iban" in Ibibio by the local women—both of which translates to "women's war"—Some historians have made a push to call it the "Women's War" in order to take the event out of a colonial lens and center it on the women involved.

See also
Bussa rebellion

References 

  Aba Commission of Inquiry. Notes of Evidence Taken by the Commission of Inquiry Appointed to Inquire into the Disturbances in the Calabar and Owerri Provinces, December, 1929] (Lagos, 1929), 24-30. 4th Witness, Nwanyeruwa (F.A.).
  Aborisade, Oladimeji, Mundt, Robert J. Politics in Nigeria. Longhorn (2002) New York, United States
  Oriji, John N. (2000). Igbo Women From 1929-1960. West Africa Review: 2, 1.

Further reading 

 Reprint, New York: Praeger, 1965. .

 Onwuteka, V. C. "The Aba Riot of 1929 and its relation to the system of'indirect rule'." Nigerian Journal of Economic and Social Studies 7.3 (1965): 273-282.
 Ukeje, Charles. "From Aba to Ugborodo: gender identity and alternative discourse of social protest among women in the oil delta of Nigeria." Oxford Development Studies 32.4 (2004): 605-617. Online
 Van Allen, Judith. "Aba Riots or the Igbo Women's War?-Ideology, Stratification and the Invisibility of Women." Ufahamu: A Journal of African Studies 6.1 (1975).</ref>
 Van Allen, Judith. "“Sitting on a man”: colonialism and the lost political institutions of Igbo women." Canadian Journal of African Studies/La Revue canadienne des études africaines 6.2 (1972): 165-181. Online

External links
Marissa K. Evans, Aba Women's Riots (November-December 1929) at blackpast.org

1929 protests
African resistance to colonialism
Wars involving Igboland
Conflicts in 1929
African women in war
History of Nigeria
1929 in Nigeria
Feminist protests
Feminism and history
Women's rights in Nigeria
1929 riots
Resistance to the British Empire
Rebellions in Africa
Women in war 1900–1945
November 1929 events
Women's protests
Women in revolutions
20th-century Nigerian women
History of women in Nigeria